Cardosoa is a genus of flowering plants belonging to the family Asteraceae. It contains a single species, Cardosoa athanasioides.

Its native range is Angola.

References

Athroismeae
Monotypic Asteraceae genera